Paula B. Stanic (also known as Paula Bardowell Stanic) is a British playwright and the winner of the 2008 Alfred Fagon Award for the best new play by a Black playwright of African or Caribbean descent living in the United Kingdom. Her play Monday was short-listed for the 2009 John Whiting Award. She has been a writer-in-residence at the Royal Court Theatre and Soho Theatre (2012-13), and a writer on attachment at the National Theatre Studio.

She grew up in Manor Park, East London. Her parents are from Jamaica, and her husband is from Serbia.

Plays 

Love & Marriage, [contributor] 2001
What's Lost, 2008
Late-night Shopping, [short] 2009
6 Minutes, [short] 2009
Monday, 2009
 Pancras Boys Club, [co-written with Ben Musgrave and David Watson] 2012
 Under a Foreign Sky, 2011
Blair's Children, [contributor] 2013
 Steering Through Stars, 2015
 Disconnect
Icons, 2017
 Messiah, 2018

References 

British dramatists and playwrights
Living people
Year of birth missing (living people)
Place of birth missing (living people)
Black British women writers